The men's 400 metres hurdles at the 2009 World Championships in Athletics was held at the Olympic Stadium on 15, 16 and 18 August.

The United States hurdling team was by far the strongest entered by any country, comprising defending champion Kerron Clement, two-time Olympic champion Angelo Taylor, 2005 World Champion Bershawn Jackson, and the emerging Johnny Dutch. The world-leading 400 m hurdler L.J. van Zyl, veterans Danny McFarlane and Félix Sánchez, and the improving Isa Phillips and Javier Culson were also identified as possible medal contenders.

In the heats, Briton Dai Greene completed an unexpected and comfortable win, while seventeen-year-old Jehue Gordon of Trinidad and Tobago surprised with a senior national record to qualify for the semis. In the semi-finals, van Zyl failed to qualify, following his pattern of poor performances at the biggest races of the season. Dutch and Phillips also failed to make the cut. Clement and Sánchez lead the way in the first semi, while Jackson and Greene (who set a personal best) took the top two spots in the other final.

In the final, Clement, Jackson and Culson all started the race well. However, it was the favourite, Clement, who took the gold medal: he was ahead at the final straight and did not relinquish his position, recording a world-leading time to win. Culson set a Puerto Rican record to take the silver, while Jackson fended off a challenge from national-record-breaking Gordon to keep third and win the bronze.

Although Clement's winning time was the second slowest in the history of the Championships, it remained a close race for the silver and bronze medals, with just 0.6 seconds between the silver medallist and seventh-placed Greene. The race had a breadth of ages, with Trinidadian Gordon becoming the youngest ever finalist of any men's sprint event at the Championships, and 37-year-old McFarlane being the oldest ever to do the same feat. Clement became the third man to win two consecutive world titles in the event, after Ed Moses and Félix Sánchez.

Medalists

Records
Prior to the competition, the following records were as follows.

Qualification standards

Schedule

Results

Heats
Qualification: First 3 in each heat(Q) and the next 4 fastest(q) advance to the semifinals.

Key:  NR = National record, PB = Personal best, Q = qualification by place in heat, q = qualification by overall place, SB = Seasonal best

Semifinals
Qualification: First 3 in each semifinal(Q) and the next 2 fastest(q) advance to the final.

Key:  NR = National record, PB = Personal best, Q = qualification by place in heat, q = qualification by overall place, SB = Seasonal best

Final

Key:  NR = National record, SB = Seasonal best, WL = World leading (in a given season)

References
General
400 metres hurdles results. IAAF. Retrieved on 2009-08-15.
Specific

400 metres hurdles
400 metres hurdles at the World Athletics Championships